Manuel Paul Wintzheimer (born 10 January 1999) is a German footballer who plays as a centre-forward for  club Eintracht Braunschweig, on loan from 1. FC Nürnberg.

Club career

Youth career
Wintzheimer began his youth career at hometown club 1. FC Arnstein, before moving on to the youth academy of 1. FC Schweinfurt. In 2010, he then moved to Greuther Fürth, before moving in 2013 to the youth academy of Bayern Munich.

Wintzheimer began in Bayern's under-17 team for the 2015–16 season, scoring 23 goals in 18 matches, before moving up to the under-19 team for the 2016–17 season. In 2017, Wintzheimer won the 2016–17 A-Junioren Bundesliga Süd/Südwest with the under-19 team, scoring 14 times during the season. The team went on to advance to the final of the A-Junioren Bundesliga championship round, before losing to Borussia Dortmund 8–7 on penalties.

Bayern Munich
Wintzheimer began his senior career with Bayern Munich II in the 2017–18 season, making his debut in the Regionalliga Bayern on 14 July 2017, opening the scoring in a 5–0 Bavarian derby home win against FC Ingolstadt II.

Hamburger SV
On 1 May 2018, it was confirmed that Wintzheimer would join 2. Bundesliga club Hamburger SV for the 2018–19 season. He made his professional debut for Hamburg in the 2. Bundesliga on 23 December 2018, coming on as a substitute in the 68th minute for Hwang Hee-chan in the 1–3 away loss against Holstein Kiel.

On 2 September 2019, Wintzheimer joined VfL Bochum on loan until the end of 2019–20 season.

1.FC Nürnberg
On 17 May 2022, it was confirmed that Wintzheimer would join 2. Bundesliga club 1. FC Nürnberg for the 2022–23 season on a free transfer. On 7 January 2023, Wintzheimer was loaned by Eintracht Braunschweig.

International career

Youth
Wintzheimer has progressed through the German youth national teams, making his debut for the under-19 team on 31 August 2017 in an away friendly match against Switzerland, with the match finishing as a 0–0 draw.

Career statistics

Club

Honours

Individual
Fritz Walter Medal U19 bronze: 2018

References

External links
 
 
 
 
 
 
 

1999 births
Living people
People from Main-Spessart
Sportspeople from Lower Franconia
Footballers from Bavaria
German footballers
Germany youth international footballers
Germany under-21 international footballers
Association football forwards
FC Bayern Munich II players
FC Bayern Munich footballers
Hamburger SV II players
Hamburger SV players
VfL Bochum players
1. FC Nürnberg players
Eintracht Braunschweig players
2. Bundesliga players
Regionalliga players